Liga Alef is the third tier of the Israeli football league system. It is divided into two regional divisions, north and south.

History
League football began in Israel in 1949–50, a year after the Israeli Declaration of Independence. However, the financial and security crises gripping the young nation caused the 1950–51 season to be abandoned before it had started. When football resumed in 1951–52, the new top division went by the name of Liga Alef. The 1952–53 season was also not played, and Liga Alef resumed in 1953–54.

In the 1955–56 season, Liga Leumit came into existence as the new top division, with Liga Alef becoming the second division. In the summer of 1976, restructuring saw the creation of Liga Artzit as a new second tier, and the second demotion of Liga Alef, as it became the third division. Further restructuring to create the Israeli Premier League in the summer of 1999 saw Liga Alef demoted again, this time to the fourth tier. At the end of the 2008–09 season, Liga Artzit was scrapped as the Premier League and Liga Leumit were expanded to 16 clubs each, with Liga Alef becoming the third tier once more.

Structure
Today, Liga Alef is split into two regional divisions on a north-south basis. Because Israel's northern half is much more densely populated than the desert south, the dividing line between the northern and southern divisions is somewhere between Haifa and Tel Aviv, meaning that the southern "half" covers about three-quarters of the country. Although this inequality is partially offset by the fact that there are so few clubs south of Beersheba (Dimona, Yeroham, Mitzpe Ramon and Eilat are the only sizable towns south of the city), the northern clubs tend to be clustered in the Galilee region, making travel to away matches much less of a chore.

Each division has sixteen clubs, who play each other home and away to make a 30-game season. The club finishing top of each regional division is promoted to Liga Leumit, whilst the eight second to fifth placed clubs have a play-off, with the winner playing-off against the third-bottom club in Liga Leumit for a place in that division. The bottom two from each division are relegated to Liga Bet, the fourth tier, and the two third-bottom clubs playing-off against play-off winners from Liga Bet for a place in Liga Alef. Coming into Liga Alef are the two or three clubs relegated from Liga Leumit and the four to six clubs promoted from Liga Bet (the winner of each of the four regional divisions, and one or two more runners-up, had they are successful in the play-off). The clubs are then pooled and assigned to the most geographically appropriate of the two divisions.

Current members
The following clubs are participating in the 2021–2022 season:

Previous seasons

1951–63

Northern division

Southern division

External links
Israel Football Association

 
3
Is
Professional sports leagues in Israel